Retiboletus griseus, commonly known as the gray bolete, is a species of bolete fungus in the family Boletaceae. The species was first described scientifically in 1878 by American botanist Charles Christopher Frost. It was transferred to Retiboletus in 2002.

References

External links

Boletaceae
Fungi described in 1878
Fungi of North America